Victor Maurel (17 June 184822 October 1923) was a  French operatic baritone who enjoyed an international reputation as a great singing actor.

Biography
Maurel was born in Marseille.  Educated in music and stagecraft at the Paris Conservatory, he made his debut in opera in 1867, in the city of his birth. The following year, he performed on stage in Paris for the first time.  New York first heard him in 1873, when he performed at the Academy of Music. Later, he would sing at New York's Metropolitan Opera (in 1894-96 and 1898–99).  Other famous venues at which he appeared included London's Royal Opera House, Covent Garden — in 1873–79, 1891–95 and 1904 — and the Paris Opera, where he was on the roster of singers from 1879 to 1894.

Maurel was renowned in Europe and the United States for his vivid stage presence and exceptional acting and make-up skills; but his voice, while well trained and of good quality, was not considered to be as impressive as that of his chief French baritone rivals, Jean Lassalle (1847–1909) and Maurice Renaud (1861–1933).

In 1887, Maurel created the role of Iago in Otello at La Scala, Milan, and then, in 1893, he created the title role in Falstaff, again at La Scala. These were the final two, and arguably the greatest, operatic masterpieces composed by Giuseppe Verdi, and it was Verdi who selected Maurel to perform in the premieres.

Maurel made operatic history for a third time in 1892 when he was chosen to be the first Tonio in Ruggero Leoncavallo's enduringly popular verismo opera, Pagliacci.

Like many Paris-trained singers of his day, Maurel was equally adept at performing roles in Italian and French. He appeared, too, in several German operas by Richard Wagner (on 30 March 1873 he sang in the first production in Milan of Lohengrin, to Gabrielle Krauss's Elsa), and was a famous Don Giovanni in Wolfgang Amadeus Mozart's opera of the same name.  George Bernard Shaw, however, though an admirer of Maurel, claimed that his genius was not Mozartian, and commented that "the problem of how to receive a call from a public statue does not seem to have struck him as worth solving".

After retiring from opera, Maurel taught singing in Paris and New York City, where he died at the age of 75. His pupils included the contralto Frances Ingram and the baritones Herbert Heyner and Thomas Quinlan (impresario).

Some impressive examples of his vocalism are preserved on gramophone records he made in the early 20th century. These recordings, which include a few French songs and arias from Otello, Falstaff and Don Giovanni, have been reissued on CD by various companies. Maurel also wrote a number of books on opera and the art of singing, and dabbled in theatrical set design. Volume One of Michael Scott's The Record of Singing (London: Duckworth, 1977) contains an informative overview of the baritone's career, an assessment of his musical importance and a brief discussion of his recordings.

References

Further reading
Warrack, John and West, Ewan (1992), The Oxford Dictionary of Opera, 782 pages,

External links

French operatic baritones
1848 births
1923 deaths
Musicians from Marseille
Fonotipia Records artists
19th-century French male opera singers
Burials at Woodlawn Cemetery (Bronx, New York)